Mir Sher Muhammad Talpur was a Talpur prince who belonged to the Mirpur Khas house of the royal Talpur dynasty. The son of Mir Ali Murad Talpur, the founder of Mirpur Khas, he was born in 1810. After becoming ruler of the Talpur dynasty, his reign saw a conflict with the British East India Company, who launched an invasion of the province of Sindh under the auspices of General Charles James Napier, aiming to annex the entire region. On 24 March 1843, troops under his command fought against a Company force in the Battle of Hyderabad; the British emerged victorious, and captured the city of Hyderbad soon after. Talpur then retreated into the countryside, where forces loyal to him and equipped largely with muskets waged a guerrilla campaign against the British,  whose efforts to counter this led Napier to coin the word "counterinsurgency". He eventually died on 24 August 1874.

References

Bibliography

External links
" "Sher-i-Sindh" by Mir Atta Muhammad Talpur"
"Mir Sher Muhammad Khan Mankani" by Mir Muhammad Bukhsh Khan Talpur

Nawabs of Pakistan
Baloch people
People from Mirpur Khas District
1810 births
1874 deaths
Indian revolutionaries
Talpur dynasty